"The Arms of the One Who Loves You" is a 1998 pop ballad released on Valentine's Day by American recording group Xscape. The song was sent to mainstream urban radio stations in the United States on March 31, 1998 and Top 40 on April 7, 1998, and was a hit for the group. The Scott sisters share leads vocals on the song. It peaked at No. 7 on the Billboard Hot 100 chart and No. 4 on the Hot R&B/Hip Hop Songs chart. It sold 800,000 copies, earning a gold certification from the RIAA.

The music video for "The Arms of the One Who Loves You" was made in early February 1998.

The JD's Mood Mix samples Tyrone Davis' "In the Mood". It is an altered version of SWV's "When U Cry" which was recorded in 1997.

Formats and track listings
These are the formats and track listings of promo single-releases of "The Arms of the One Who Loves You".
"The Arms of the One Who Loves You" (JD's mood mix) – 4:13
"The Arms of the One Who Loves You" (JD's mood mix w/out rap) – 4:13
"The Arms of the One Who Loves You" (JD's mood mix instrumental) – 4:13
"The Arms of the One Who Loves You" (Frankie Knuckles club mix) – 9:05
"The Arms of the One Who Loves You" (Frankie Knuckles reprise) – 4:39
"The Arms of the One Who Loves You" (Flash Dance AKA club mix) – 4:32

Charts

Weekly charts

Year-end charts

Certifications

References

1998 singles
Xscape (group) songs
Songs written by Diane Warren
1997 songs
Contemporary R&B ballads
Columbia Records singles
Pop ballads
Soul ballads
1990s ballads